Padstow Lifeboat Station is at Trevose Head west of Padstow, in Cornwall. It is run by the Royal National Lifeboat Institution (RNLI), and the current lifeboat is a Tamar class boat called Spirit of Padstow.

History 
 4 January 1827 - The first lifeboat Mariners Friend was built by the Padstow Harbour Association and kept at Hawker's Cove.
 11 November 1829 - The first boathouse was built for the lifeboat by Padstow Harbour Association.
 22 December 1855 - Padstow branch of the RNLI was formed.
 25 July 1856 - The arrival of the Albert Edward.
 1863 - New boathouse built to take larger lifeboat.
 December 1864 - Stone slipway added to boathouse.
 6 February 1867 - Five crewmen drowned (See Padstow Lifeboat disasters).
 15 August 1883 - Arrival of the Arab.
 4 September 1883 - Carriage house for lifeboat built in Trethillick Lane.
 21 February 1899 - Arrival of the James Stevens No 4 (a new steam lifeboat).
 11 April 1900 - Both lifeboats lost and eight crewmen drowned (See Padstow Lifeboat disasters).
 29 August 1901 - Arrival of the second Arab.
 12 September 1901 - Arrival of the Edmund Harvey and steam tug Helen Peele.
 10 August 1917 - Admiralty commandeered Helen Peele for the duration of the First World War.
 April 1929 - Arrival of the Princess Mary.
 1 June 1931 - Arrival of the John and Sarah Eliza Stych the station's first motor lifeboat.
 1931 - A new boathouse and roller slipway were built at Hawker's Cove for a second motor lifeboat (No.2).
 8 February 1938 - Station numbers change over.
 1 December 1947 - Arrival of the J.H.W from Lytham St Anne's.
 14 August 1951 - Arrival of the Bassett Green.
 30 November 1952 - Arrival of the James Hiram Chadwick.
 22 May 1962 - The No.2 station closed because of silting.
 20 October 1967 - No 1 Station closed.
 20 October 1967 - A new boathouse and 240 ft slipway were opened at Trevose Head.
19 July 1968 - New boathouse officially inaugurated; march 'The Padstow Lifeboat' commissioned from Cornwall-resident composer Malcolm Arnold for the occasion.
 20 October 1967 - Arrival of the James and Catherine MacFarlane.
 1984 - The boathouse was adapted for the station's Tyne class lifeboat the James Burrough.
 18 December 1984 - Arrival of the James Burrough.
 1991 - Major repairs were carried out to the substructures of both the boathouse and slipway.
 24 July 1993 - Alan C. Tarby appointed Coxswain.
 August 2006 - The new boathouse and slipway at Trevose Head was opened.
 August 2006 - The arrival of the Spirit of Padstow.

Building description 
The building was designed by Royal Haskoning engineers, with sub-consultants Poynton Bradbury Wynter Cole architects, and John Martin Construction Ltd. The building won the 2007 Structural Award for Community Structures.

Fleet

Hawker's Cove Station
The Hawker's Cove station was known as the number 1 station from 1899 to 1938 and the number 2 station from 1938 to 1962.

Station closed 1962

Camel estuary mooring 
This was known as the number 2 station from 1899 to 1938 then the number 1 station from 1938 to 1962

Station closed 1967

Trevose Head Station

Awards and honours 
Crew members from Padstow have been awarded 28 silver and two Bronze RNLI medals, in addition to a number of other RNLI awards, including:
 1911 - A Silver Medal was awarded to Coxswain William H Baker for rescuing the Master of the ship Angèle.
 1928 - A Bronze Medal was awarded to Coxswain William J Baker for rescuing 18 crew of the steamer .
 1929 - A Bronze Medal was awarded to Joseph Atkinson, Master of the steam tug Helen Peele for rescuing five crew from the wrecked fishing vessel Our Girlie on 27 November 1928.
 1945 - A Silver Medal was awarded to Second Motor Mechanic William Orchard for rescuing seven people from the steamer Sjofna on 23 November 1944. He also received the Maud Smith Award for the bravest act of life-saving in 1944.
 1946 - A Silver Medal was awarded to Coxswain John T Murt for rescuing 10 crew from the steamer Kedah.
 1966 - A Silver Medal was awarded to Coxswain Gordon Elliott and Thanks of the Institution Inscribed on Vellum to the crew for rescuing two men from the fishing vessel Deo Gratias that was in difficulties in a gale gusting to violent storm on 23 November 1965.
 1976 - Special framed certificates were presented to the Coxswain and crew after the lifeboat was severely damaged by a heavy sea causing injuries to the coxswain and some of the crew on 7 December.
 1977 - Silver Medals were awarded to Coxswain Anthony Warnock and Second Coxswain/Assistant Mechanic Trevor England for saving two crew and a dog from the yacht Calcutta Princess which was in difficulties close to rocks off Dinas Head. The Thanks of the Institution Inscribed on Vellum were awarded to the other members of the lifeboat crew.
 1979 - Special framed certificate was awarded to the Coxswain and crew for several services to numerous yachts in difficulties during the Fastnet Race on 14/15 August.
 1979 - A Silver Medal was awarded to Coxswain Trevor England when the lifeboat stood by the Greek freighter Skopelos Sky in difficulty off Trevose Head in a westerly hurricane and phenomenal seas on 15 December. Thanks of the Institution Inscribed on Vellum were awarded to the crew and slipway helpers who were at times up to their necks in the sea getting the lifeboat back on her slipway. The winchman was presented with a Vellum Service Certificate.
 1 January 1988 - H.E.Murt awarded a BEM.
 1989 - A Framed Letter of Thanks was sent to the Coxswain and crew after the lifeboat stood by the cargo vessel Secil Japan which had grounded on rocks in Deadman's Cove.
 11 June 1992 - Trevor R England awarded a BEM.

Lifeboat disasters 
 6 February 1867 - During a service to the Georgiana five of the lifeboat crew drowned after the lifeboat capsized - Daniel Shea, William Intross, Thomas Varco, Andrew Truscott and Michael Crennel. A memorial to the men who died can be seen in St. Petroc's church, Padstow (just on the right through the door).
 11 April 1900 - With a strong WSW wind blowing, the ketch Peace and Plenty of Lowestoft, struck on the Greenaway Rocks. Five of her crew were rescued by the Trebetherick Rocket Brigade and three were drowned. Meanwhile, at 18:30hrs the pulling lifeboat Arab was launched and when about 40 yards from the Peace and Plenty anchored in order to veer down on her. While at anchor the Arab was struck by a tremendous sea which buried the lifeboat, washed eight of her crew overboard and broke all 10 of her oars. The lifeboat was wrecked on the rocks but the crew reached shore safely. The steam lifeboat James Stevens No. 4 then launched and, as she was leaving the harbour, she was caught by a heavy swell and capsized. Eight of her crew of eleven were drowned: Coxswain David Grubb, John W. Bate, James Grubb, E Kane, JS Martin, JB Old, J Stephens and S East. A memorial to the men can be seen in Padstow Cemetery.

See also 
 List of RNLI stations

References

 A Short History of the Padstow Lifeboat

External links 
 The official website of Padstow Lifeboat Station
 RNLI Station Guide - Padstow

Lifeboat stations in Cornwall
Padstow